Aeroflot Flight 068 was a regularly scheduled passenger flight operated by Aeroflot from Khabarovsk Novy Airport in Khabarovsk Krai to Pulkovo Airport in Saint Petersburg with intermediate stops  at Tolmachevo Airport in Ob, Russia, then Koltsovo Airport in Yekaterinburg. On 16 March 1961, the Tupolev Tu-104B operating this flight crashed shortly after take off from Koltsovo Airport. Three passengers and two crewmembers were killed along with two people on the ground.

The Air Accident Investigation Commission concluded the cause of the accident was the failure of engine No. 2 (right) due a broken turbine blade.

Accident

After takeoff from Koltsovo Airport while climbing though  altitude as the crew reduced the engine power from takeoff setting, engine No. 2 began vibrating severely.

The crew was uncertain which engine was failing and were unable to use the engine instruments because the instrument panel was vibrating violently. A crew member decided to reduce power on engine No. 1 in an attempt to determine if it was the source of the shaking, but he inadvertently pulled the throttle lever too far back, shutting down that engine. With neither engine operating the airliner began descending rapidly and the crew decided there was not enough altitude to restart engine No. 1.

Searching for a suitable place to set down, the crew choose to make an emergency landing on a frozen pond  from the airport. Turning 90 degrees to the right and descending the crew lined up for the landing at a high speed with the flaps and landing gear retracted.

Passing beneath an overhead power line and severing it with the vertical stabilizer the Tupolev first struck the ice with its left wing tip, then crashed down on the ice traveling  before reaching the shore. Still moving at speed, the aircraft struck trees near the shore and continued on, destroying part of the ground floor of a two-story vacation home, killing two people inside.

Most of the right wing was torn from the aircraft and remained in the home. Simultaneously the left wing struck another home, tearing off half the wing and causing the home's complete destruction. There was no fire and the fuselage broke into three main pieces, remaining close together at the crash site.

Aircraft
Construction of the Tupolev Tu-104B involved, serial number 920805, was completed at the Kazan Aircraft Production Association aircraft factory on 24 July 1959. On 4 August 1959 the Tupolev was acquired by Aeroflot. At the time of the accident, the aircraft had sustained a total of 1,600 flight hours and 789 takeoff and landing cycles.

Investigation
The Air Accident Investigation Commission examining the wreckage discovered engine No. 2 suffered a contained failure and determined the main cause of the accident was the fracture of blade number 54 in the second stage of the turbine section. This blade suffered a fatigue crack along the first groove of the blade lock and detached from the turbine hub at high speed causing massive damage to the engine. The Commission also cited the crew members error in shutting down the No.1 engine as a secondary factor in the crash.

Agents of the Tupolev design bureau and the engine manufacturer stated that because the engine failure was contained the aircraft would have been able to return to the airport on one engine. Based on this opinion their position was that the accidental shut down of engine No. 1 was the main reason for the accident.

See also
Aeroflot accidents and incidents
Aeroflot accidents and incidents in the 1960s
Kegworth air disaster
TransAsia Airways Flight 235
Airlink Flight 8911

References

Aviation accidents and incidents in 1951
Accidents and incidents involving the Tupolev Tu-104
Aviation accidents and incidents in the Soviet Union
68
1961 in the Soviet Union
Airliner accidents and incidents caused by engine failure